A list of rivers of Rhineland-Palatinate, Germany:

A
Aar
Adenauer Bach
Ahr
Alf
Alfbach
Appelbach
Asdorf
Aubach

B
Birzenbach
Blattbach
Breitenbach
Brexbach
Brohlbach, tributary of the Moselle
Brohlbach, tributary of the Rhine

D
Daade
Dernbach

E
Eckbach
Eisbach, tributary of the Queich
Eisbach, tributary of the Rhine
Elbbach
Ellerbach, tributary of the Moselle
Ellerbach, tributary of the Nahe
Elzbach
Engelsbach
Enz
Erlenbach, tributary of the Lauter
Erlenbach, tributary of the Michelsbach
Erlenbach, tributary of the Speyerbach
Eußerbach

F
Feller Bach
Floßbach
Fockenbach

G
Glan
Gillenbach
Gosenbach
Großbach, tributary of the Nahe
Großbach, tributary of the Ruwer
Gutenbach

H
Hainbach
Heimersheimer Bach
Heller
Helmbach
Hochspeyerbach
Holperbach
Holzbach
Horn

I
Irserbach
Isenach

K
Little Kyll
Klingbach
Kyll

L
Lahn
Lambsbach
Langbach
Langendernbach
Lasterbach
Laubach
Lauter
Lehbach
Leukbach
Lieser
Lohrbach

M
Mandelbach
Mehrbach
Merzalbe
Michelsbach
Middle Rhine
Modenbach
Moosalb
Moosbach
Moselle
Mußbach

N
Nahe
Nette
Nims
Nister

O
Odenbach
Otterbach
Our

P
Palmbach
Pfrimm
Prims
Prüm

Q
Queich

R
Rehbach
Reisbach
Rhine
Ringelbach
Riveris
Rodalb
Rodenbach
Ruwer

S
Saar
Salm
Salzbach, tributary of the Elbbach
Salzbach, tributary of the Lauter
Sauer, tributary of the Moselle
Sauer, tributary of the Rhine
Sayn
Schinderbach
Schwarzbach
Seltenbach
Selz
Sieg
Speyerbach
Spiegelbach
Spießbach
Swist

T
Tiefenbach

U
Upper Rhine
Üßbach

V
Vinxtbach
Völkerwiesenbach

W
Wadrill
Weidas
Wellbach
Welzbach
Wied
Wiesbach
Wisser Bach
Wörsbach

Rhineland
 
Rivers